The 1995–96 Marist Red Foxes men's basketball team represented Marist College in the 1995–96 NCAA Division I men's basketball season. The Red Foxes, led by tenth-year head coach Dave Magarity, played their home games at the James J. McCann Recreation Center in Poughkeepsie, New York as members of the Northeast Conference. They finished the season 22–7, 14–4 in NEC play, finishing in second place. As the No. 2 seed in the NEC tournament, they advanced to the semifinals, where they were defeated at home by third-seeded Monmouth 56–57. The Red Foxes earned an invite to the 1996 NIT, traveling to Rhode Island and were defeated in the first round 77–82.

Previous season
The Red Foxes finished the 1994–95 season 17–11, 12–6 in NEC play to finish in a tie for second place. As the No. 3 seed in the NEC tournament, they advanced to the semifinals, where they were defeated on the road by No. 2 seeded Mount St. Mary's 79–84.

Roster

Schedule and results

|-
!colspan=9 style="background:#B31B1B; color:#FFFFFF;"| Regular season

|-
!colspan=9 style="background:#B31B1B; color:#FFFFFF;"|NEC tournament
|-

|-
!colspan=9 style="background:#B31B1B; color:#FFFFFF;"|NIT tournament
|-

Source

References

Marist Red Foxes men's basketball seasons
Marist
Marist Red Foxes men's basketball
Marist
Marist Red Foxes men's basketball